They Call It Summer is a 2012 Italian romance-drama film directed by Paolo Franchi. In spite of having been almost unanimously panned by critics, it won the awards for Best Director and for Best Actress (to Isabella Ferrari) at the 2012 Rome International Film Festival.

Cast 

 Jean-Marc Barr as Dino
 Isabella Ferrari as Anna
 Filippo Nigro as the swinger
 Eva Riccobono as the prostitute
 Luca Argentero as Alessandro
 Romina Carrisi as Chiara
 Maurizio Donadoni as Carlo

References

External links

2012 films
Italian romantic drama films
Films directed by Paolo Franchi
2012 romantic drama films
Films scored by Philippe Sarde
Italian erotic drama films
Erotic romance films
2010s Italian films